Áine Phillips is a performance and visual artist based in Galway, Ireland.

Education 
Phillips received her Bachelors of Arts in Fine Art Sculpture at the National College of Art and Design in Dublin in 1988. In 2001, she received her Masters of Fine Art in Research at Limerick School of Art and Design. Eight years later, Phillips acquired a Practice Based PhD in Fine Art Sculpture at National College of Art and Design.

Work 
Phillips has been exhibiting multi-media installation and performance works internationally since the late 1980s. Some of her major exhibitions include Moving Image Gallery and The Kitchen New York, National Review of Live Art, Glasgow, Irish Film Centre, Dublin Live Art Festival, Arthouse Dublin, EV+A Limerick, and the Hugh Lane, Dublin.

Her work has been shown in solo and group exhibitions, and selected screenings and film festivals in countries across the world, including Sweden, Brazil, Australia, and the United States. Phillips work has been supported by the Live Art Development Agency in London, and the Arts Council of Ireland.

Phillips is the Head of Sculpture at Burren College of Art in Ballyvaughan, County Clare, Ireland.

Awards 
Phillips has received many awards, some of which include:

 2021: Arts Council Agility Award and Fingal County Arts Office Bursary
 2019: Arts Council Project Award and Galway 2020 European Capital of Culture Award
 2017: Arts Council Project Award
 2015: Culture Ireland Travel Grant
 2014: Clare County Council Arts Office Artists Support Grant
 2013: Arts Council Project Award and Culture Ireland Travel Award
 2012: Clare County Council Arts Office Artists Support Grant
 2011: Arts Council Touring Award and Clare County Council Arts Office Artists Support Grant
 2010: Arts Council Project Award and Galway County Council Per Cent for Art Award
 2010: Culture Ireland Touring Grant and Japan Foundation and British Council Awards
 2009: Arts Council of Ireland Artists Bursary and Project Award for Live@8
 2008: Clare County Council Arts Awards and Culture Ireland Travel Award
 2005: Arts Council of Ireland Commission Award with Tulca Festival Galway
 2004: Clare County Council Public Art Commission
 2003: European Commission for Education and Culture Art Project Funding
 2002: Department of Foreign Affairs, Cultural Relations Committee Award

References

External links
 
 Áine Phillips' Official Website
 Áine Phillips' YouTube Channel

Irish performance artists
Living people
Year of birth missing (living people)